Schill was a wolfpack of German U-boats that operated during the battle of the Atlantic in World War II.

Service history
Following the resumption of the assault on the Atlantic convoy routes in the Autumn of 1943, U-boat Control (Befehlshaber der Unterseeboote) (BdU) switched the focus of the campaign in October to the Mid-Atlantic and South Atlantic routes. To this end it  established the wolfpack Schill off the coast of Portugal, to intercept convoys sailing to and from Gibraltar, Mediterranean and South Atlantic.

Schill comprised ten U-boats, and commenced operations on 25 October. Its first action was against home-bound convoy SL 138/MKS 28. During this assault the freighter Hallfried was  sunk by U-262 on 29 October; however U-306 was sunk by convoy escorts Whitehall and Geranium on 31 October. 
Following this attack, Schill remained on patrol, but had no further successes. On 9 November, U-707 was caught and sunk by Allied aircraft, a B-17 of 220 Squadron.

On 16 November Schill was reinforced and re-organized into three groups. The first, Schill 1, of eight U-boats, was the southernmost rake, running in a  line to the west of Lisbon.

On 18 November U-boats of Schill 1 opened the attack on convoy SL 139/MKS 30; over the next three days the boats of all three Schill groups were involved with three U-boats destroyed. On 18 November U-211 was sunk by a Wellington, and on the 19th  U-536  by Nene and Snowberry. On the 21st U-538, en route from the North Atlantic to join Schill was caught and sunk by escorts Foley and Crane. Two aircraft were shot down  on 20  November; a Liberator by U-648 and a Sunderland by U-618, but no ships were sunk from the convoy.

With the end of the convoy battle on 22 November the Schill groups were disbanded; a number returned to base, while a cadre remained to form a new patrol line, code-named Weddigen.

U-boats involved
(25 October-16 November 1943) 
Schill 
 
 
 
  sunk 31 October 1943
 
 
 
 
  sunk 9 November 1943
 

(16–22 November 1943) 

Schill 1 
 sunk 18 November 1943

( sunk 21 Nov. en route to join)

Schill 2 

 sunk 19 November 1943

Schill 3

Notes

References

External links 

Wolfpacks of 1943